"Homer the Vigilante" is the eleventh episode of the fifth season of the American animated television series The Simpsons. It originally aired on the Fox network in the United States on January 6, 1994. In the episode, a crime wave caused by an elusive cat burglar plagues Springfield. Lisa is distraught when her saxophone is stolen, and Homer promises to get it back. The police are ineffective, so Homer takes charge of a neighborhood watch. Under his leadership, it becomes a vigilante group which fails to catch the burglar. With the help of Grampa, Homer discovers that the burglar is a charming senior named Molloy. Molloy is arrested, but he outwits the citizens of Springfield and escapes.

The episode was written by John Swartzwelder and directed by Jim Reardon. Sam Neill guest starred in the episode as Molloy. "Homer the Vigilante" was selected for release in a 1997 video collection of selected episodes titled: The Simpsons: Crime and Punishment. It features cultural references to films such as It's a Mad, Mad, Mad, Mad World and Dr. Strangelove.

Since airing, the episode has received positive reviews from television critics. It acquired a Nielsen rating of 12.2, and was the highest-rated show on the Fox network the week it aired.

Plot
Springfield is plagued by a cat burglar who makes several burglaries, including the Simpsons' house. Among the stolen items are Lisa's saxophone, Marge's pearl necklace, Bart's stamp collection, and a handheld television. The town's residents arm themselves and install security devices to thwart the burglar. A neighborhood watch group is formed and Homer is elected as its leader. The street patrol soon devolves into a vigilante group whose members violate laws instead of catching criminals. When Homer is interviewed on news anchor Kent Brockman's Smartline, the cat burglar calls the show and reveals he plans to steal the world's largest cubic zirconia from the Springfield museum.

Homer's posse guards the museum, refusing the help of Grampa and his friends from the Springfield Retirement Castle. After Homer spots a group of teenagers drinking beer, he leaves his post to intervene, but gets drunk with them instead. When the cat burglar subsequently steals the zirconia, Homer is blamed and pelted with fruits and vegetables by the unforgiving townspeople. Later, Grampa reveals that the cat burglar is a fellow resident of the retirement home named Molloy. Homer captures Molloy at the home, and the surprisingly amiable cat burglar returns the objects he stole. Chief Wiggum arrests and imprisons him.

At the police station, Molloy casually observes that Homer and the cops would like to know where he hid his loot. When Molloy tells them the stash is hidden under a giant "T" somewhere in Springfield, they rush from the station hoping to find the buried treasure. After checking several possible sites, the crowd returns to get more information from Molloy, who directs them to a large, T-shaped palm tree on the outskirts of town. The residents excavate the site, but find only a box containing a note from Molloy; he lied about the treasure in order to buy himself enough time to escape from his cell. Several citizens continue to dig, hoping that there is a real treasure, but soon find themselves at a loss for ways to get out of the hole they have made.

Production

The episode was written by John Swartzwelder and directed by Jim Reardon. New Zealand actor Sam Neill guest starred in the episode as Molloy, the cat burglar. Executive producer David Mirkin thought Neill, a big The Simpsons fan, was "lovely" to direct. Mirkin also said Neill was "really game" and did "a terrific job" on the episode. Neill considers recording this episode to be a "high-point" of his career. One scene of the episode features Kent Brockman reporting on the burglaries. Mirkin said this was a joke the staff enjoyed doing because it pointed out how negative and mean-spirited news broadcasts can be, and how they are seemingly "always trying to scare everybody" by creating panic and depression.

"Homer the Vigilante" originally aired on the Fox network in the United States on January 6, 1994. The episode was selected for release in a 1997 video collection of selected episodes titled: The Simpsons: Crime and Punishment. Other episodes included in the collection set were "Marge in Chains", "Bart the Fink", and "You Only Move Twice". It was included in The Simpsons season five DVD set, The Simpsons - The Complete Fifth Season, which was released on December 21, 2004. Creator Matt Groening, supervising director David Silverman, and Mirkin appeared in the episode's audio commentary on the season five DVD. The episode was again included in the 2005 DVD release of the Crime and Punishment set.

Cultural references

The Molloy character is based on actor David Niven's performance as the character A. J. Raffles, a gentleman thief, in the 1939 film Raffles. The music heard at the beginning of the episode during the burglaries is taken from the film The Pink Panther, in which Niven played The Phantom, a similar character. Flanders tells Homer that his Shroud of Turin beach towels were stolen during one of the burglaries.  Homer's dream of riding a nuclear bomb into oblivion is a reference to the famous scene from the film Dr. Strangelove or: How I Learned to Stop Worrying and Love the Bomb. Homer's line "So I said, Look buddy, your car was upside-down when I got here. And as for your grandma, she shouldn't have mouthed off like that!" is a reference to Flannery O'Connor's short story "A Good Man Is Hard to Find". The scene of Homer and Principal Skinner talking in front of the museum is a reference to a scene from the television series Dragnet. In a reference to the plot of the 1963 film It's a Mad, Mad, Mad, Mad World, Molloy sends the residents of Springfield on a hunt for a treasure that is buried under a big letter. The ending sequence of the episode also references the film by using the same music and camera angles. In another scene that references It's a Mad, Mad, Mad, Mad World, Bart tricks American actor Phil Silvers into driving his car into a river, just like Silvers's character did in the film.

Reception

Critical reception
Since airing, the episode has received mostly positive reviews from television critics. The authors of the book I Can't Believe It's a Bigger and Better Updated Unofficial Simpsons Guide, Warren Martyn and Adrian Wood, thought it was "a bit lacking in focus", but it contained "a number of satisfying set-pieces — we like Professor Frink's walking house security system — and displays Wiggum at his all-time most useless."

DVD Movie Guide's Colin Jacobson wrote: "After the many plots of the prior show, 'Vigilante' maintains a much tighter focus. It’s nothing quite as wonderful an episode as its immediate predecessor, but it’s strong nonetheless. Much of the humor comes from Homer’s newfound power and abuse of it. If nothing else, it’s a great program due to Homer’s reaction to Lisa’s jug playing."

Patrick Bromley of DVD Verdict gave the episode a grade of B, and Bill Gibron of DVD Talk gave it a score of 4 out of 5.

Les Winan of Box Office Prophets named "Homer the Vigilante", "Cape Feare", "Homer Goes to College", "$pringfield", and "Deep Space Homer" his favorite episodes of season five.

It was also the Liverpool Daily Post's Mike Chapple's favorite episode of the season, together with "Bart Gets an Elephant" and "Burns' Heir".

Ratings
In its original broadcast, "Homer the Vigilante" finished 41st in the ratings for the week of January 3–9, 1994, with a Nielsen rating of 12.2, equivalent to approximately 11.5 million viewing households. It was the highest-rated show on the Fox network that week.

References

External links

 

The Simpsons (season 5) episodes
1994 American television episodes
Fictional vigilantes
Television shows written by John Swartzwelder